Lisi Castillo (born 3 April 1985) is a Cuban table tennis player. Her highest career ITTF ranking was 169.

References

1985 births
Living people
Cuban female table tennis players
Table tennis players at the 2015 Pan American Games